Agios Georgios is a village located in the Kyrenia District of Cyprus, west of the town of Kyrenia. It is under the de facto control of Northern Cyprus. Its population in 2011 was 3,745.

References

Communities in Kyrenia District
Populated places in Girne District